James Adam Bradley  (February 14, 1830 – June 6, 1921) was a wealthy Manhattan brush manufacturer, financier, member of the New Jersey Senate, philanthropist, and real estate developer. He designed the resort destination of Asbury Park on the New Jersey Shore. Bradley was also involved in the development of Bradley Beach, which bears his name.

Biography
Bradley was born on February 14, 1830, in Rossville, Staten Island, New York, United States, to Hannah and Adam Bradley. At age sixteen, in 1846, he became an apprentice brush maker for Bernalds & Weeks in New York City. In 1857 he established his own brush making business, Bradley & Smith, in New York City. Bradley was married to Helen M. Packard of Boston; they had no children.

Bradley converted from Catholic to Methodist, and was very close philosophically with the leaders of the Ocean Grove Camp Meeting Association who ran the summer retreat on the New Jersey shore. These relationships lead Bradley to focus his attention on developing the area around Ocean Grove.

Bradley named the new community Asbury Park after Francis Asbury, the founder of Methodism in the United States.

Bradley served as the first postmaster of Asbury Park from 1874 to 1884, and established the city's first newspaper, the Asbury Park Journal (1876–1910), serving as its editor and proprietor until 1882. Bradley began Asbury Park's first sewerage system in 1881, and set up water & gas works in 1884. Bradley also served as the first Mayor of Asbury Park, New Jersey (1893–1902) and as a councilman. In 1894, Bradley was elected to the New Jersey Senate from Monmouth County.

The City of Asbury Park sued Bradley for control of his beachfront property and sewer system in 1902. Bradley lost the suit.

Bradley died June 6, 1921.  He was interred at Woodlawn Cemetery in The Bronx, New York.

Legacy

Bradley set aside park lands, waterfront areas, and urban scale blocks, that widened at the ocean. Bradley donated land to religious and civic groups, and the public library. Bradley is responsible for the creation of the mile-long oceanfront boardwalk that remains today.

A statue of Bradley stands in front of the Paramount Theater and Convention Hall complex in Bradley Park. Constructed shortly after his death to mark the 50th anniversary of the city's founding, a campaign began in 2017 to remove the statue based on Bradley's history of instituting segregation on the beach and boardwalk that he owned. Bradley was pressured into this by hotel owners and a campaign by the Asbury Park Daily Journal upon complaints of White visitors in 1885. Previously, the oceanfront was open to all. Bradley openly explained his motivations to Black groups.  He felt that should Asbury Park remain integrated and cease to attract White visitors, economic ruin would result. The city's economy was negatively impacted in the 1970s when the number of White visitors declined after the beach and boardwalk were reintegrated. Members of the Asbury Park Historical Society acknowledged Bradley's use of segregation but opposed removal of the statue.

References 

1830 births
1921 deaths
Mayors of Asbury Park, New Jersey
New Jersey state senators
People from Asbury Park, New Jersey
People from Bradley Beach, New Jersey
People from Rossville, Staten Island
19th-century American businesspeople
Converts to Methodism from Roman Catholicism
Bradley Beach, New Jersey